Kelana Jaya may refer to:
Kelana Jaya
Kelana Jaya (federal constituency), represented in the Dewan Rakyat (2004–present)
Kelana Jaya (state constituency), formerly represented in the Selangor State Legislative Assembly (1986–2004)